The Prix du livre politique (the political book prize) is an annual French literary prize awarded to the best political book published. The €5,000 award was established by Lire la Société, a French group whose goal is to revive interest in public affairs. The prize announcement is one of the events of the Journée du Livre Politique (Political Book Day), organized by the group since 1991. The prize is to promote reflection, discourse and political thought. The year 2020 marks the 18th edition of this recognition, which began in 2003.

Winners 
Since 1995, 11 of 18 winners have been journalists.
 1995 - Le passé d’une illusion, François Furet, Éditions Robert Laffont
 1996 - Les blessures de la vérité, Laurent Fabius, Editions Flammarion
 1997 - Le voleur dans la maison, Jean-François Revel, Editions Plon
 1998 - Par l’amour de l’art, Régis Debray, Editions Gallimard
 1999 - Une ambition française, Alain Duhamel, Editions Plon
 2000 - Libération, la biographie, Jean Guisnel, Editions La Découverte (Jean Guisnel a été rédacteur en chef du journal de 1991 à 1996)
 2001 - L’abolition, Robert Badinter, Editions Fayard
 2002 - Le gouvernement invisible, Laurent Joffrin, Editions Arléa (among the members of the jury was Michèle Cotta
 2003 - J’ai vu finir le monde ancien, Alexandre Adler, Editions Grasset
 2004 - Ni putes ni soumises, Fadela Amara, Editions La Découverte
 2005 - Le venin de la mélancolie, Denis Tillinac, Editions la Table ronde
 2006 - La tentation obscurantiste, Caroline Fourest, Editions Grasset
 2007 - Qu’est-ce que l’intégration ?, Dominique Schnapper, Editions Gallimard
 2008 - La Reine du monde : essai sur la démocratie d’opinion, Jacques Julliard, Editions Flammarion
 2009 - Cahiers secrets de la Ve République : Tome 2, 1977-1986, Michèle Cotta, Fayard (parmi les membres du jury il y a Laurent Joffrin)
 2010 - Le sorcier de l'Elysée, l'histoire secrète de Jacques Pilhan, François Bazin, Plon
 2011 -  La France est-elle finie ?, Jean-Pierre Chevènement, Fayard
 2012 - Populisme : la pente fatale, Dominique Reynié, Plon, 2011
 2013 - Jours de pouvoir, Bruno Le Maire, Gallimard, 2012
 2014 - La récréation, Frédéric Mitterrand, Robert Laffont, 2013
 2015 - Les Chirac - Les secrets du clan, Béatrice Gurrey, Robert Laffont, 2015
 2016 - Un Français de tant de souches, Alain Minc, Editions Grasset, 2015
2017 - Plus rien à faire, Plus rien à foutre, Brice Teinturier, Robert Laffont, 2016 
2018 - Printemps de force : Une histoire engagée du mouvement étudiant au Québec (1958-2013), Arnaud Theurillat-Cloutier, Lux Éditeur, 2017 
2019 - L’économie sociale au Québec : Une perspective politique, Gabriel Arsenault, Presses de l'Université du Québec, 2018 
2020 - TBA

References 

French literary awards